Zhusilengops is an extinct genus of trilobite in the class Trilobita.

References

Trilobites
Articles created by Qbugbot